In combustion, Burke–Schumann limit, or large Damköhler number limit, is the limit of infinitely fast chemistry (or in other words, infinite Damköhler number), named after S.P. Burke and T.E.W. Schumann, due to their pioneering work on Burke–Schumann flame. One important conclusion of infinitely fast chemistry is the non-co-existence of fuel and oxidizer simultaneously except in a thin reaction sheet. The inner structure of the reaction sheet is described by Liñán's equation.

Limit description
In a typical non-premixed combustion (fuel and oxidizer are separated initially), mixing of fuel and oxidizer takes place based on the mechanical time scale dictated by the convection/diffusion (the relative importance between convection and diffusion depends on the Reynolds number) terms. Similarly, chemical reaction takes certain amount of time  to consume reactants. For one-step irreversible chemistry with Arrhenius rate, this chemical time is given by

Similarly, one can define  appropriate for particular flow configuration. The Damköhler number is then

Regardless of Reynolds number, the limit  guarantees that chemical reaction dominates over the other terms. A typical conservation equation for the scalar  (species concentration or energy) takes the following form,

Taking the limit  in the above equation, we find that

i.e., fuel and oxidizer cannot coexist, since far away from the reaction sheet, only one of the reactant is available (non premixed). On the fuel side of the reaction sheet,  and on the oxidizer side, . Fuel and oxygen can coexist (with very small concentrations) only in a thin reaction sheet, where  (diffusive transport will be comparable to reaction in this zone). In this thin reaction sheet, both fuel and oxygen are consumed and nothing leaks to the other side of the sheet. Due to the instantaneous consumption of fuel and oxidizer, the normal gradients of scalars exhibit discontinuities at the reaction sheet.

See also
Activation energy asymptotics
Liñán's equation
Liñán's diffusion flame theory

References

Fire
Combustion
Fluid dynamics